Miss Macao was a Catalina seaplane owned by Cathay Pacific and operated by subsidiary Macau Air Transport Company. On 16 July 1948 it was involved in the first hijacking of a commercial aircraft. Piracy for robbery and ransom was the motive. The aircraft crashed after the pilot was shot while resisting the attackers, leaving one of the hijackers as the sole survivor of the incident.

The lone survivor, Wong Yu, confessed to membership of the gang of four pirates who attempted the hijacking (then simply labelled "piracy"). The hijackers met with fierce resistance during which the pilot was shot, causing the aircraft to crash, but Wong Yu survived by jumping out the emergency exit just before the plane hit the water.  The object of the plot was to rob wealthy passengers and hold them for ransom. He was brought to court by the Macau police, but the Macau court suggested that the prosecution should be brought in Hong Kong instead, since the plane was registered in Hong Kong and most of the passengers were from there. However, the British colonial government in Hong Kong stated that the incident happened over Chinese territory in which the British had no jurisdiction. Since no state claimed authority to try him, Wong was released without trial from Macao Central Prison on 11 June 1951, and was then deported to China (by then the People's Republic of China).

See also 

1933 Imperial Airways Diksmuide crash, the first act of in-flight airline sabotage
List of sole survivors of airline accidents or incidents

References 

History of Macau
Aircraft hijackings in China
Airliner accidents and incidents caused by hijacking
Aviation accidents and incidents in China
Aviation accidents and incidents in 1948
Accidents and incidents involving the Consolidated PBY Catalina
Mass murder in 1948
1948 in China
History of Guangdong
Individual aircraft
July 1948 events in Asia